Systena dimorpha is a species of flea beetle in the family Chrysomelidae. This species is known from western Canada to South Dakota, south to Kansas and west to California.

References 

Alticini
Beetles of North America
Beetles described in 1933